Champsanglard is a commune in the Creuse department in the Nouvelle-Aquitaine region in central France.

Geography
The river Creuse forms the southern boundary of the commune.

Population

Sights
 The church of St. Martin, dating from the twelfth 
 The castle of Lasvy

See also
Communes of the Creuse department

References

Communes of Creuse